Conchifera is a subphylum of the phylum Mollusca. It comprises all of the shell-bearing classes of molluscs, such as clams, tusk shells, ammonites, and monoplacophorans. The other subphylum is Aculifera.
Non-monoplacophoran conchiferans emerged within the once-widespread Monoplacophora. The only descendant which retains its ancestral shape is the Tryblidiida.

This taxonomic term is used mostly by paleontologists, and not by scientists who study the living molluscs.

Classes
Classes within the Conchifera include:
 Monoplacophora
 Bivalvia
 Gastropoda
 Scaphopoda
 Cephalopoda
 Archinacelloidea†
 Rostroconchia†
 Helcionelloida†

See also
 Evolution of Mollusca

References

External links
 BioLib info

Mollusc taxonomy
Animal subphyla
Prehistoric mollusc taxonomy